Tarang may refer to:

Geography
Tarang River Thailand, tributary of the Pa Sak River, part of the Chao Phraya River basin
Tarang, Afghanistan
Tarang (Yap), an island in the main harbor of Yap Island, Micronesia

Percussion instruments
Tabla tarang (Hindi: तबला तरंग) percussion instrument consisting of between ten and sixteen tuned dayan drum
Jal tarang (Hindi: जल तरंग, Urdu: جل ترنگ, [dʒəl tərəŋg]), ceramic bowls with water
Kanch tarang, a type of glass harp List of Indian musical instruments
Bulbul tarang (Hindi: बुलबुल तरंग), nightingale harp
Kashtha tarang, a type of xylophone List of Indian musical instruments

Other
Tarang Chawla (born 1987), Indian-born Australian activist and writer
Tarang (film), 1984 film directed by Kumar Shahani
Radio Tarang, former radio station based in Hisar city of Haryana, India
Tarang TV, Odia-language based general entertainment channels
Tarang Music, 24-hour music channel owned by Odisha Television Ltd of India
Young Tarang, third music album of the Pakistani pop duo sensation Nazia and Zoheb
Tarang Jain (born 1962/63), Indian billionaire businessman

See also
Tarang wa (Thai: ตารางวา, rtgs: tarang wa, IPA: [tāːrāːŋ wāː]) or square wa, unit of area used in Thailand